Gajine is a village in Croatia.

Population

According to the 2011 census, Gajine had 116 inhabitants.

Note: From 1857- 1880 data is included in the settlement of Donji Lapac. In 2001 part of the settlement (hamlet), by name Boričevac, became an independent settlement.

1991 census 

According to the 1991 census, the settlement of Gajine had 257 inhabitants, who were ethnically described as follows:

Note: Together with settlement of Boričevac.

Austro-Hungarian 1910 census 

According to the 1910 census, the settlement of Gajine had 772 inhabitants in 6 hamlets, who were linguistically and religiously described as follows:

Literature 

  Savezni zavod za statistiku i evidenciju FNRJ i SFRJ, popis stanovništva 1948, 1953, 1961, 1971, 1981. i 1991. godine.
 Knjiga: "Narodnosni i vjerski sastav stanovništva Hrvatske, 1880-1991: po naseljima, autor: Jakov Gelo, izdavač: Državni zavod za statistiku Republike Hrvatske, 1998., ;

References

Populated places in Lika-Senj County